Westwood Hospital was a health facility in The Woodlands, Beverley, East Riding of Yorkshire, England. Both the original block and the gateway are Grade II listed buildings.

History
The hospital has its origins in the Beverley Union Workhouse which was designed by John and William Atkinson and opened in 1861. An infirmary was added in 1893 and the entrance arch was completed in 1895. It became the Beverley Public Assistance Institution in 1930 and joined the National Health Service as Westwood Hospital in 1948. After services transferred to the East Riding Community Hospital in July 2012, Westwood Hospital and the buildings were redeveloped for residential use by PJ Livesey as Westwood Park.

References

Hospitals established in 1861
1861 establishments in England
Hospital buildings completed in 1861
Hospitals in the East Riding of Yorkshire
Defunct hospitals in England
Beverley